The Prime Minister of Mongolia is the head of government of Mongolia. The office was established in 1912, shortly after Mongolia declared its independence from the Qing dynasty during the Mongolian Revolution of 1911.

From 1924 to 1992, during the Mongolian People's Republic, the official title of the head of government underwent several changes, including Chairman of the Council of People's Commissars, Chairman of the Council of Ministers, and finally, Prime Minister.

Prime ministers of Mongolia (1912–present)

(Dates in italics indicate de facto continuation of office)

See also
 List of Mongol rulers
 President of Mongolia
 List of heads of state of Mongolia
 Prime Minister of Mongolia

Notes

References

Mongolia
Prime Minister
Prime ministers
1912 establishments in Mongolia